The Angat River (also called Quingua River) is a river in the Philippines located in the province of Bulacan. It flows from the Sierra Madre mountain range to Manila Bay. Three dams are located along the river namely Angat, Ipo and Bustos. The catchment or basin area of the river is  located in the Angat Watershed Forest Reserve. Angat River snakes through the municipalities of Doña Remedios Trinidad, Norzagaray, Angat, Bustos, San Rafael, Baliwag, Plaridel, Pulilan, Calumpit, Paombong, and Hagonoy. The river joins the Pampanga River at Calumpit via the Bagbag River.

Crossings 
This is listed from mouth to source.

 Hangga Bridge (Paombong–Hagonoy boundary)
 Iba-Ibayo Bridge (Paombong–Hagonoy boundary)
 Labangan Bridge #1 (Calumpit)
 Angat Bridge (Plaridel–Pulilan boundary)
 Plaridel-Pulilan Bridge (Plaridel–Pulilan boundary)
 New Plaridel-Pulilan Bridge (Plaridel–Pulilan Diversion Road, Plaridel–Pulilan boundary)
 General Alejo Santos Bridge (Baliwag–Bustos boundary)
 Plaridel Bypass Road (Bustos–San Rafael boundary)
 Angat Bridge (M. Valte Road, Angat)
 Matictic Bridge (Dr. S. Pascual Road, Norzagaray)
 Bitbit Bridge (Norzagaray)

Gallery

References

Rivers of the Philippines
Landforms of Bulacan